Cerbera manghas, the sea mango, is a small evergreen coastal tree growing up to  tall. It is native to coastal areas in Africa, Asia, Australasia, and the Pacific islands. It is classified as one of the three species in the genus Cerbera that constitute mangroves.

Description
The shiny dark-green leaves grow in a spiral arrangement, and are ovoid in shape. They have five stamens and the ovary is positioned above the other flower parts. At maturity they turn bright red.

Toxicity
The leaves and the fruits contain the potent cardiac glycoside cerberin, which is extremely poisonous if ingested. This was utilised in trials of ordeal done towards criminal suspects in the Merina Kingdom ruling the island of Madagascar until the practice was abolished during Radama II's reign. On the opposite spectrum, Fijians use its (vasa, rewa) leaves in dried form to treat skin irritations and eye pains.

Long ago, people used the sap of the tree as a poison for animal hunting.

Goffin's cockatoo is one of the creatures known to eat sea mangos.
In addition, the Coconut crab can become toxic to humans if it eats too much sea mango due to a buildup of cardiac cardenolides.

Gallery

References

manghas
Flora of tropical Asia
Flora of the Tubuai Islands
Decorative fruits and seeds
Plants described in 1753
Taxa named by Carl Linnaeus
Poisonous plants